Kollam MEMU Shed is an ISO certified motive power depot facility for maintaining MEMU rakes, situated in the city of Kollam in the Indian state of Kerala. It is one of the four MEMU rake maintenance sheds serving the Southern Railway zone of the Indian Railways. Kollam MEMU Shed is functioning as the control and coordination center of MEMU trains running through Kerala state. The maintenance works of those rakes are regularly doing in Kollam MEMU shed.

History 

MEMU sheds in Kollam and Palakkad were proposed in 2008's Indian Railway Budget. The first announced MEMU shed for Kerala was in Kollam, but the inauguration of this shed was delayed for more than two years due to clearance issues and negligence of Indian Railways. Palakkad MEMU shed inaugurated on 1 January 2011. The Kollam MEMU shed was formally commissioned on 1 December 2013, five years after its completion. Kollam MEMU Shed is the largest MEMU Shed in Kerala.

In the second half of 2019, the Southern Railway started replacing the traditional rakes with High-speed, three-phase MEMU trains running on Kollam routes. As the first step, a three-phase MEMU train with 8 rakes started service on Kollam Junction-Ernakulam Junction-Kollam Junction route on September 2, 2019.

Maintenance of MEMU 
The MEMU Carshed in Kollam currently conducting periodic overhauling activities for two different types of rakes manufactured by ICF, Chennai:

 Generation I rakes
 3-phase 8 coach rake (Total capacity: 2,402  passengers)

See also 
 Kollam
 Kollam Junction railway station
 Kollam district
 Ernakulam-Kottayam-Kayamkulam line

References

External links 

Electric railway depots in India
Rail transport in Kollam
†
2013 establishments in Kerala
Buildings and structures in Kollam